Fejervarya moodiei is a species of frog in the family Dicroglossidae.
It has in the past been often mixed with Fejervarya cancrivora; its distribution is not well known but includes the Philippines (its type locality is Manila, Luzon), Thailand, Hainan Island (China), and India. Its natural habitats are freshwater marshes and intermittent freshwater marshes.

References

moodiei
Amphibians of China
Frogs of India
Amphibians of the Philippines
Amphibians of Thailand
Taxonomy articles created by Polbot
Amphibians described in 1920